Annette Hamilton (born 1945) is a leading Australian born and based cultural anthropologist and senior fellow of the Australian Anthropological Society who first undertook significant fieldwork, appeared as an expert in land rights claims, and published on Aboriginal Australian peoples of the Northern Territory plus remote South Australia, later specializing and becoming a key practitioner lecturing and publishing on the visual anthropology of media in Southeast Asia.

References

External links
 'Professor Annette Hamilton' @ UNSW School of the Arts and Media
 Annette-Hamilton.com

1945 births
Living people
Australian anthropologists
Australian women anthropologists